Sergei Sergeyevich Obivalin (born 20 March 1995) is a Russian football player who plays for FC Rotor Volgograd.

Club career
He made his debut in the Russian Football National League for FC Krylia Sovetov Samara on 2 November 2014 in a game against FC SKA-Energiya Khabarovsk.

References

External links
 Profile by Russian Football National League

1995 births
Footballers from Moscow
Living people
Russian footballers
Association football defenders
FC Sportakademklub Moscow players
PFC Krylia Sovetov Samara players
FC Lada-Tolyatti players
FK Atlantas players
FC Chernomorets Novorossiysk players
FC Saturn Ramenskoye players
FC Tekstilshchik Ivanovo players
FC Tom Tomsk players
FC Rotor Volgograd players
Russian expatriate footballers
Expatriate footballers in Lithuania
Russian expatriate sportspeople in Lithuania